Lepidospartum is a genus of North American desert shrubs in the daisy family. They are known commonly as broomsages or scalebrooms. These are tall, woody shrubs with stiff twiggy branches that resemble brooms. They are native to the southwestern United States and far northern Mexico. These shrub have thin, narrow, needlelike or scalelike leaves and bear yellow daisy flowers.

Lepidospartum burgessii is an endangered species.

 Species
 Lepidospartum burgessii - gypsum scalebroom - New Mexico, Texas
 Lepidospartum latisquamum - Nevada broomsage - California, Nevada, Utah
 Lepidospartum squamatum - California broomsage - California, Arizona, Baja California

References

External links
 USDA Plants Profile
 Jepson Manual Treatment

Senecioneae
Asteraceae genera
Flora of North America